This was the first edition of the event.  Juan Sebastián Cabal and Robert Farah won the title, defeating David Marrero and Marcelo Melo in the final, 6–4, 6–2.

Seeds

Draw

Draw

Qualifying

Seeds

Qualifiers
  Federico Delbonis /  Leonardo Mayer

Qualifying draw

References
 Main Draw

Rio Open - Men's Doubles
Rio
Rio Open